Bucculatrix exedra is a species of moth of the family Bucculatricidae. It is found in Japan (Honshu, Shikoku, Kyushu) and India. It was first described in 1915 by Edward Meyrick.

The wingspan is about 8 mm.

The larvae feed on Firmiana platanifolia. They mine the leaves of their host plant. The spiral linear mine is an upper surface mine. Second instar larvae leave the mine and spins a thin, flattened, whitish cocoon on the surface of the leaf. The third instar larva feeds on the epidermis and some mesophyll on the upper surface of the leaf. When full-grown the larva descends to the ground by silk or moves to some convenient place, and spins an elongate cocoon on the twig, the trunk or lower surface of the leaf.

External links
Revisional Studies on the Family Lyonetiidae of Japan (Lepidoptera)

Bucculatricidae
Moths described in 1915
Taxa named by Edward Meyrick
Moths of Japan
Moths of Asia